Aleksey Rudenok (born 25 February 1993) is a Belarusian professional footballer.

On 6 August 2020, the BFF banned Rudenok from Belarusian football for 2 years for his involvement in the match fixing.

References

External links 
 
 

1993 births
Living people
Belarusian footballers
Association football forwards
FC Gorodeya players
FC Isloch Minsk Raion players
FC Rechitsa-2014 players
FC Kletsk players
FC Krumkachy Minsk players
FC Neman Stolbtsy players
FC Smorgon players